Socialism, Sexism & Sexuality is the debut studio album by British indie pop musical project White Town, released in 1994 through Parasol Records. All of the tracks were written and recorded on an 8-track recorder.

Track listing

References

White Town albums
1994 debut albums
Alternative rock albums by British artists
Electronica albums by British artists